The Binondo–Intramuros Bridge is a tied-arch bridge in Manila, Philippines that spans the Pasig River. It connects Muelle de Binondo in Binondo and in San Nicolas to Solana Street and Riverside Drive in Intramuros. The bridge has four lanes and exhibits a steel bowstring arch design with inclined arches.

The bridge is controversial due to its location at the historic center of Manila, near the San Agustin Church heritage site.

History

Planning and funding

The bridge is a part of the  infrastructure grant by China under the Agreement on Economic and Technical Cooperation, which was agreed upon by China and the Philippines following a state visit of Philippine President Rodrigo Duterte to China in May 2017. On June 22, 2017, the Department of Public Works and Highways and the Chinese embassy signed a Minutes of Discussion regarding the full grant and financing the construction of the bridge.

By July 2017, the feasibility study for the bridge was completed.

Construction and opening
Construction was expected to begin within 2017. The DPWH Unified Project Management Office-Roads Management Cluster I will implement the construction of the bridge, while China Road and Bridge Corporation is the contractor of the project. The groundbreaking ceremony for the bridge led by President Rodrigo Duterte took place on July 17, 2018. The bridge was expected to be completed in September 2021, but was delayed to December 2021 due to the COVID-19 pandemic.

On April 5, 2022, President Rodrigo Duterte and other government officials inaugurated the bridge. It was opened on the same day.

Pedestrian stairways are currently being completed, with the actual stairways now being welded into place. These were not present during the bridge's inauguration due to logistic issues.

Design

Designed according to new seismic specifications and taking into consideration the impact of climate change, the bridge is a basket-handle tied-arch bridge.

The ramps on both sides branch out to different streets. The entrance ramp on the Binondo side is located along Muelle de la Industria in San Nicolas, while its exit ramp in the same side runs above Estero de Binondo and ends at Muelle de Binondo, intersecting Santo Cristo Street (near South San Nicolas Volunteer Fire Brigade) in San Nicolas on the west bank and Rentas Street in Binondo on the east bank. On the other hand, the entrance ramp on the Intramuros side is located along Riverside Drive while its exit ramp ends at the intersection of Andres Soriano Avenue, Muralla Street, and Solana Street, just beside Aduana Building.

Reception

Heritage conservationists groups has expressed concerns regarding the proposed bridge. International Council on Monuments and Sites (ICOMOS) Philippines advises against the construction of a vehicular bridge connecting Binondo and Intramuros suggesting a pedestrian bridge instead. A study conducted by the organization found the construction of the proposed Binondo–Intramuros Bridge will likely affect the Aduana Building in Intramuros due to its soft foundation as well as the Chamber of Commerce Building and Plaza Mexico. It also notes that the bridge will cover the Estero de Binondo and the Puente de San Fernando will be demolished to give way for the bridge's construction. ICOMOS Philippines has also said that the bridge will worsen traffic conditions in the area and will cause visual and air pollution. The organization also notes that ramps of the proposed bridge will affect the buffer zone of the San Agustin Church and Monastery, a World Heritage Site. The case of the desisting of the City of Dresden as a World Heritage Site due to the construction of the Waldschlösschen Bridge has been cited by ICOMOS Philippines with regards to the proposed Binondo–Intramuros Bridge and has raised concerns that the bridge project could threaten the bid of the whole Intramuros area to become a UNESCO World Heritage Site.

Heritage Conservation Society also has opposed the project while the Advocates for Heritage Preservation has urged the bridge to be designed to complement the area's Spanish colonial architecture. The Chamber of Commerce of the Philippine Islands has also opposed the planned bridge due to heritage and pollution concerns. It proposed instead to expand the Del Pan and Jones Bridges.

Despite its controversial nature, the bridge became a new hangout for sightseers due to its unique design since its opening, where a daily gathering of people taking pictures and posing beside the structure has been noted, especially in good weather.

See also
List of crossings of the Pasig River
Estrella–Pantaleon Bridge
China–Philippines relations

References

Bridges in Manila
Buildings and structures in Binondo
Buildings and structures in Intramuros
Buildings and structures in San Nicolas, Manila
China–Philippines relations